Serb(ian) People's Party, Serb(ian) Popular Party, Serb(ian) National Party is a translation of  and the name of a number of political parties:

 Serbian People's Party (2014) led by Nenad Popović
 Serb People's Party (Croatia) in the Republic of Croatia
 Serb People's Party (Dalmatia) in the former Kingdom of Dalmatia
 Serb People's Party (Kosovo) in Kosovo, the disputed province of Serbia
 Serb People's Party (Montenegro) in Republic of Montenegro